Tadeusz Kalinowski (1 June 1915 – 22 August 1969) was a Polish actor. He appeared in thirty films and television shows between 1954 and 1979.

Selected filmography
 How to Be Loved (1963)
 Pięciu (1964)
 Czterej Pancerni i Pies (1966)
 Everything for Sale (1969)

References

External links

1915 births
1969 deaths
Polish male film actors
People from Leibnitz